Anthony Manning (born September 4, 1992) is an American soccer player who plays for Detroit City FC in the USL Championship.

Career

College
Manning spent his entire college career at Saint Louis University.  He made a total of 76 appearances for the Billikens and tallied five goals and two assists.

Professional
Manning was selected in the third round (52nd overall) of the 2015 MLS SuperDraft by the Portland Timbers.  On March 29, he signed a professional contract with USL affiliate club Portland Timbers 2.  He made his professional debut that same day in a 3–1 victory over Real Monarchs SLC.

Manning was signed to Portland Timbers MLS squad on July 13, 2015.

Manning signed with North American Soccer League side Indy Eleven on March 9, 2017.

On February 15, 2021, Detroit City FC announced that they had signed Manning pending approval from NISA and the USSF.

Honors

Club
Portland Timbers
MLS Cup: 2015
Western Conference (playoffs): 2015

References

External links

Saint Louis Billikens bio

1992 births
Living people
American soccer players
Association football defenders
Indy Eleven players
People from Mesquite, Texas
Portland Timbers draft picks
Portland Timbers players
Portland Timbers 2 players
Detroit City FC players
Saint Louis Billikens men's soccer players
Soccer players from Texas
Sportspeople from the Dallas–Fort Worth metroplex
USL Championship players
National Independent Soccer Association players
American expatriate sportspeople in Sweden
Expatriate footballers in Sweden
American expatriate soccer players